The following is a list of episodes of the American reality television series Bad Girls Club broadcast on Oxygen. It was first shown on December 5, 2006 and ended on May 2, 2017. As of 2017, 275 episodes have aired, including specials. Bad Girls Club has spawned four spin-off series: Bad Girls Road Trip, Bad Girls All-Star Battle, Love Games: Bad Girls Need Love Too and Tanisha Gets Married.

Series overview

Episodes

Season 1 (2006–07) 

.

Season 2 (2007–08)

Season 3 (2008–09)

Season 4 (2009-10)

Season 5 (2010)

Season 6 (2011)

Season 7 (2011)

Season 8 (2012)

Season 9 (2012)

Season 10 (2013)

Season 12 (2014)

Season 13 (2014–15)

Season 14 (2015)

Season 15 (2016)

Season 16 (2016)

Season 17 (2017)

References 

Lists of American reality television series episodes
 Episodes